Attica is an administrative region of Greece, that encompasses the entire Athens Metropolitan area, the country's capital and largest city. The region is coextensive with the former Attica Prefecture of Central Greece and covers a greater area than the historical region of Attica.

Overview
Located on the eastern edge of Central Greece, Attica covers about 3,808 square kilometers. In addition to Athens, it contains within its area the cities of Elefsina, Megara, Laurium, and Marathon, as well as a small part of the Peloponnese peninsula and the islands of Salamis, Aegina, Angistri, Poros, Hydra, Spetses, Kythira, and Antikythera. About 3,800,000 people live in the region, of whom more than 95% are inhabitants of the Athens metropolitan area. In 2019, Attica had the HDI of 0.912, the highest in Greece.

Administration
The region was established in the 1987 administrative reform, and until 2010 it comprised the 4 prefectures of Athens, East Attica, Piraeus and West Attica.

With the 2010 Kallikratis plan, the region's powers and authority were completely redefined and extended. Since 1 January 2011, the region represents the second-level local administration. While being supervised by the Decentralized Administration of Attica, it is now an independent self-governing body with powers and a budget comparable to the former prefectures.

The region is subdivided into eight subordinate regional units:

 North Athens
 West Athens
 Central Athens
 South Athens
 West Attica
 East Attica
 Piraeus
 Islands

Electoral districts
The Attica region consists of eight electoral districts: Athens A, Athens B1, Athens B2, Athens B3, Piraeus A, Piraeus B, East Attica and West Attica.

Major communities

 Acharnés (Αχαρνές) or Menídi
 Agía Paraskeví (Αγία Παρασκευή)
 Ágios Dimítrios (Άγιος Δημήτριος)
 Aigáleo (Αιγάλεω)
 Alimos (Άλιμος) or Kalamaki
 Athína (Αθήνα) (Municipality of Athens)
 Chalándri (Χαλάνδρι)
 Galátsi (Γαλάτσι)
 Glyfáda (Γλυφάδα)
 Ílion (Ίλιον) (formerly Nea Liosia)
 Ilioúpoli (Ηλιούπολη)
 Kallithéa (Καλλιθέα)
 Keratsíni (Κερατσίνι)
 Kifissia (Κηφισιά)
 Korydallós (Κορυδαλλός)
 Maroúsi (Μαρούσι) or Amaroúsion
 Néa Ionía (Νέα Ιωνία)
 Néa Smýrni (Νέα Σμύρνη)
 Níkaia (Νίκαια)
 Palaió Fáliro (Παλαιό Φάληρο)
 Peiraiás (Πειραιάς) (Piraeus in English)
 Peristéri (Περιστέρι)
 Výronas (Βύρωνας)
 Zográfos (Ζωγράφος)

See also
 List of municipalities and communities in Attica
 List of settlements in Attica

Demographics
The region has shrunk by 35,965 people between 2011 and 2021, experiencing a population loss of 0.9%.

Economy 
The Gross domestic product (GDP) of the region was 87.4 billion € in 2018, accounting for about 47% of the Greek economic output. GDP per capita adjusted for purchasing power was 28,000 € or 93% of the EU27 average in the same year. The GDP per employee was 99% of the EU average. Attica is the region in Greece with the highest GDP per capita. Despite that, the unemployment rate stood at 21.6% in 2017.

Transportation

Roads and highways
The main roads and highways of Attica are:
 Motorway 1 (Athens-Thessaloniki)
 Motorway 6 (northern beltway of Athens)
 Motorway 8 (Eleusis-Corinth)
 Motorway 62 (Athens Airport link)
 Motorway 64 (eastern beltway of Athens)
 Motorway 65 (western beltway of Athens)
 Motorway 642 
 Greek National Road 1 (old road Athens-Thessaloniki)
 Greek National Road 3 (Elefsina-Lamia-Florina)
 Greek National Road 8 (old road Athens-Patras)
 Greek National Road 79
 Greek National Road 83 (Marathonos Avenue)
 Greek National Road 89
 Greek National Road 91

Ferry lines
Numerous ferry lines, both normal ferries and the "flying dolphins" (fast sea vessels), connect the port of Piraeus with the islands of the region.

Other
 Athens Mass Transit System
 Athens Metro
 Athens Tram
 Proastiakos
 Transit System (Attica)

Sports

Football clubs
Premier and second division Superleague & Football League
 AEK - Nea Filadelfeia (Athens)
 Apollon - Athens
 Atromitos - Peristeri (Athens)
 Egaleo FC (or Egaleo) - Egaleo (Athens)
 Ethnikos Asteras - Kesariani (Athens)
 Ethnikos Piraeus - Piraeus
 Haidari F.C. - Haidari (Athens)
 Ilisiakos - Zografou (Athens)
 Ionikos - Nikaia (Piraeus)
 Kallithea - Kallithea (Athens)
 Olympiacos - Piraeus
 Panathinaikos - Athens
 Panionios - Nea Smyrni (Athens)
 Proodeftiki – Korydallos (Piraeus)
 Thrasivoulos - Fyli (West Attica)

Third division Football League 2
 Acharnaikos - Acharnes (Menidi)
 Agios Dimitrios F.C. – Agios Dimitrios (Athens)
 Aias Salamina - Salamina
 Charavgiakos F.C. - Ilioupoli (Athens)
 Ilioupoli GS - Ilioupoli (Athens)
 Koropi AO – Koropi
 Vyzas - Megara

Junior division/unassorted
 Aittitos - Spata
 Aris Petroupoli – Petroupoli (Athens)
 Aris Vari FC – Vari
 Artemis FC – Artemida (Loutsa)
 Aspropyrgos F.C. – Aspropyrgos
 Gyziakos - Gyzi (Athens)
 Kouvaras AC - Kouvaras
 Olympiakos Papagou - Papagou (Athens)
 Panelefsiniakos - Elefsina

All sports
 Ampelokipoi AC - Athens (in the area of Ampelokipoi), fourth division
 Ethnikos GS - Athens, fourth division
 Fokianos Athinon - Athens, fourth division

Mini football
 Mini football pitches - Online bookings
 Mini football pitches and football academies 
 Mini football pitches

References

External links 

  

Central Greece
 
NUTS 1 statistical regions of Greece
NUTS 2 statistical regions of the European Union
States and territories established in 1987
Administrative regions of Greece
1987 establishments in Greece